The War of the Worlds is a science fiction novel by English author H. G. Wells, written between 1895 and 1897, first serialised in 1897 by Pearson's Magazine in the UK and by Cosmopolitan magazine in the US. The novel's first appearance in hardcover was in 1898 from publisher William Heinemann of London. It is one of the earliest stories to detail a conflict between mankind and an extra-terrestrial race. The novel is the first-person narrative of both an unnamed protagonist in Surrey and of his younger brother in London as southern England is invaded by Martians. The novel is one of the most commented-on works in the science fiction canon.

The book's plot was similar to numerous works of invasion literature which were published around the same period, and has been variously interpreted as a commentary on the theory of evolution, British colonialism, and Victorian-era fears, superstitions and prejudices. Wells later noted that an inspiration for the plot was the catastrophic effect of European colonisation on the Aboriginal Tasmanians; some historians have argued that Wells wrote the book in part to encourage his readership to question the morality of imperialism. At the time of the book's publication, it was classified as a scientific romance, like Wells's earlier novel The Time Machine.

The War of the Worlds has been both popular (having never been out of print) and influential, spawning half a dozen feature films, radio dramas, a record album, various comic book adaptations, a number of television series, and sequels or parallel stories by other authors. It was memorably dramatised in a 1938 radio programme, directed by and starring Orson Welles, that allegedly caused public panic among listeners who did not know the book's events were fictional. The novel has even influenced the work of scientists, notably Robert H. Goddard, who, inspired by the book, helped develop both the liquid-fuelled rocket and multistage rocket, which resulted in the Apollo 11 Moon landing 71 years later.

Plot

The Coming of the Martians

The novel opens by stating that in the mid-1890s, aliens on Mars began plotting an invasion of Earth because their own resources were dwindling. The main narrative begins when an object thought to be a "meteor" lands on Horsell Common, near the narrator's home. The narrator discovers that it is an artificial cylinder. Some Martians emerge briefly, but have difficulty coping with Earth's atmosphere and gravity. When humans approach the cylinder with a white flag, the Martians incinerate them. Military forces arrive that night. 

The next day, the narrator takes his wife to safety in nearby Leatherhead. That day, he sees a three-legged Martian "fighting-machine" (tripod), armed with a heat-ray and a chemical weapon: the poisonous "black smoke". Tripods have wiped out the army around the cylinder and destroyed most of Woking. The narrator and a fleeing artilleryman try to escape, but are separated during a Martian attack. As refugees try to cross the River Thames, the army destroys a tripod, and the Martians retreat. The narrator travels to Walton, where he meets a curate.

The Martians attack again and people begin to flee London, including the narrator's brother, who travels with a Mrs Elphinstone and her sister-in-law to keep them safe. They reach the coast and buy passage to Continental Europe. Tripods attack, but a torpedo ram, HMS Thunder Child, destroys two of them before being destroyed, and the evacuation fleet escapes. Shortly thereafter, all organised resistance collapses, and the Martians roam the shattered landscape unhindered.

The Earth under the Martians
At the beginning of Book Two, the narrator and the curate witness a Martian machine seizing people and tossing them into a carrier. The narrator realises that the Martian invaders may have plans for their victims. When a fifth Martian cylinder lands, both men are trapped beneath the ruins of a house for two weeks. The narrator describes Martian anatomy and how they use living creatures' blood to nourish themselves. The two men's relationship deteriorates, and eventually, the narrator knocks the curate unconscious. A Martian removes the curate's body, but the narrator escapes detection.

The Martians abandon the cylinder's crater, and the narrator emerges from the collapsed house and heads for West London. En route, he finds Martian red weed everywhere, prickly vegetation spreading wherever there is abundant water, but slowly dying. On Putney Heath, he encounters the artilleryman again. After abandoning him, he begins to go mad from his trauma, finally attempting suicide by openly approaching a stationary fighting machine. To his surprise, he discovers that all the Martians have been killed by an onslaught of earthly pathogens, to which they had no immunity.

The narrator suffers a nervous breakdown and is nursed back to health by a kind family. Eventually, he returns to Woking, and discovers that his wife has survived. In the last chapter, he reflects on the Martian invasion, its impact on humanity's view of itself and the future, and the effect it has had on his mind.

Style
The War of the Worlds presents itself as a factual account of the Martian invasion. It is considered one of the first works to theorise the existence of a race intelligent enough to invade Earth. The narrator is a middle-class writer of philosophical papers, somewhat reminiscent of Doctor Kemp in The Invisible Man, with characteristics similar to author Wells at the time of writing. The reader learns very little about the background of the narrator or indeed of anyone else in the novel; characterisation is unimportant. In fact, none of the principal characters are named, aside from the astronomer Ogilvy.

Scientific setting
Wells trained as a science teacher during the latter half of the 1880s. One of his teachers was Thomas Henry Huxley, a major advocate of Darwinism. Wells later taught science, and his first book was a biology textbook. He joined the scientific journal Nature as a reviewer in 1894. Much of his work is notable for making contemporary ideas of science and technology easily understandable to readers.

The scientific fascinations of the novel are established in the opening chapter where the narrator views Mars through a telescope, and Wells offers the image of the superior Martians having observed human affairs, as though watching tiny organisms through a microscope. Ironically it is microscopic Earth lifeforms that finally prove deadly to the Martian invasion force. In August 1894, the journal Nature reported a sighting by a French astronomer of a "strange light" on Mars. Wells used this observation to open the novel, imagining these lights to be the launching of the Martian cylinders toward Earth.

The Italian astronomer Giovanni Schiaparelli observed geological features on Mars in 1878, which he called canali (Italian for "channels"). This concept was explored by American astronomer Percival Lowell in the book Mars in 1895, speculating that these might be irrigation channels constructed by a sentient life form to support existence on an arid, dying world, similar to that which Wells suggests the Martians have left behind. The novel also explores ideas related to Charles Darwin's theory of natural selection.

Wells also wrote an essay titled 'Intelligence on Mars', published in 1896 in the Saturday Review, which sets out some of the ideas for the Martians and their planet that are used almost unchanged in The War of the Worlds. In the essay he speculates about the nature of the Martian inhabitants and how their evolutionary progress might compare to humans.

Wells has also theorised how life could evolve in conditions that are so hostile, like those on Mars. The creatures have no digestive system, no appendages except tentacles and put the blood of other beings in their veins to survive. Wells was writing some years before 1901, when the Austrian Karl Landsteiner discovered the three human blood groups (O, A, and B), showing that even the blood of some humans can be lethal when introduced into the veins of other humans (if they belong to incompatible blood groups). But even before that discovery, it was clearly implausible that the blood of beings from one planet could be successfully introduced to the veins of creatures from another planet.

Physical location

In 1895, Wells was an established writer and he married his second wife, Catherine Robbins, moving with her to the town of Woking in Surrey. There, he spent his mornings walking or cycling in the surrounding countryside, and his afternoons writing. The original idea for The War of the Worlds came from his brother during one of these walks, pondering on what it might be like if alien beings were suddenly to descend on the scene and start attacking its inhabitants.

Much of The War of the Worlds takes place around Woking and the surrounding area. The initial landing site of the Martian invasion force, Horsell Common, was an open area close to Wells's home. In the preface to the Atlantic edition of the novel, he wrote of his pleasure in riding a bicycle around the area, imagining the destruction of cottages and houses he saw by the Martian heat ray or their red weed. While writing the novel, Wells enjoyed shocking his friends by revealing details of the story, and how it was bringing total destruction to parts of the South London landscape that was familiar to them. The characters of the artilleryman, the curate, and the brother medical student were also based on acquaintances in Woking and Surrey.

Wells wrote in a letter to Elizabeth Healey about his choice of locations: "I'm doing the dearest little serial for Pearson's new magazine, in which I completely wreck and sack Woking – killing my neighbours in painful and eccentric ways – then proceed via Kingston and Richmond to London, which I sack, selecting South Kensington for feats of peculiar atrocity."

Fifty meters further up the pedestrianised street is a concrete and brick representation of a Martian cylinder.

Cultural setting
Wells's depiction of late Victorian suburban culture in the novel was an accurate representation of his own experiences at the time of writing. In the late 19th century, the British Empire was the predominant colonial power on the globe, making its domestic heart a poignant and terrifying starting point for an invasion by Martians with their own imperialist agenda. Wells also drew upon a common fear that had emerged in the years approaching the turn of the century, known at the time as fin de siècle or 'end of the age', which anticipated an apocalypse occurring at midnight on the last day of 1899.

Publication

In the late 1890s it was common for novels, prior to full volume publication, to be serialised in magazines or newspapers, with each part of the serialisation ending on a cliffhanger to entice audiences to buy the next edition. This is a practice familiar from the first publication of Charles Dickens's novels earlier in the nineteenth century. The War of the Worlds was first published in serial form in the United Kingdom in Pearson's Magazine in April – December 1897. Wells was paid £200 and Pearsons demanded to know the ending of the piece before committing to publish. The complete volume was first published by William Heinemann (of London publishing house Heinemann) in 1898 and has been in print ever since.

Two unauthorised serialisations of the novel were published in the United States prior to the publication of the novel. The first was published in the New York Evening Journal between December 1897 and January 1898. The story was published as Fighters from Mars or the War of the Worlds. It changed the location of the story to a New York setting. The second version changed the story to have the Martians landing in the area near and around Boston, and was published by The Boston Post in 1898, which Wells protested against. It was called Fighters from Mars, or the War of the Worlds in and near Boston.

Both pirated versions of the story were followed by Edison's Conquest of Mars by Garrett P. Serviss. Even though these versions are deemed as unauthorised serialisations of the novel, it is possible that H. G. Wells may have, without realising it, agreed to the serialisation in the New York Evening Journal.

Holt, Rinehart & Winston re-pressed the book in 2000, paired with The Time Machine, and commissioned Michael Koelsch to illustrate a new cover art.

Reception
The War of the Worlds was generally received very favourably by both readers and critics upon its publication. The Illustrated London News wrote that Wells's work had "a very distinct success" when serialised in Pearson’s magazine. The story did even better as a book, and reviewers rated it as "the very best work he has yet produced". The book's London publisher Heinemann had a plentiful supply of positive reviews for use in promotions, with reviewers highlighting the story's originality in representing Mars in a new light through the concept of an alien invasion of Earth. 

Writing for Harper's Weekly, Sidney Brooks admired Wells's writing style: "he has complete check over his imagination, and makes it effective by turning his most horrible of fancies into the language of the simplest, least startling denomination". Praising Wells's "power of vivid realization", The Daily News reviewer wrote, "the imagination, the extraordinary power of presentation, the moral significance of the book cannot be contested". There was, however, some criticism of the brutal nature of the events in the narrative.

Relation to invasion literature

Between 1871 and 1914 more than 60 works of fiction for adult readers describing invasions of Great Britain were published. The seminal work was The Battle of Dorking (1871) by George Tomkyns Chesney, an army officer.  The book portrays a surprise German attack, with a landing on the south coast of England, made possible by the distraction of the Royal Navy in colonial patrols and the army in an Irish insurrection. The German army makes short work of English militia and rapidly marches to London. The story was published in Blackwood's Magazine in May 1871 and was so popular that it was reprinted a month later as a pamphlet which sold 80,000 copies.

The appearance of this literature reflected the increasing feeling of anxiety and insecurity as international tensions between European Imperial powers escalated towards the outbreak of the First World War. Across the decades the nationality of the invaders tended to vary, according to the most acutely perceived threat at the time. In the 1870s the Germans were the most common invaders. Towards the end of the nineteenth century, a period of strain on Anglo-French relations, and the signing of a treaty between France and Russia, caused the French to become the more common menace.

There are a number of plot similarities between Wells's book and The Battle of Dorking. In both books, a ruthless enemy makes a devastating surprise attack, with the British armed forces helpless to stop its relentless advance, and both involve the destruction of the Home Counties of southern England. However The War of the Worlds transcends the typical fascination of invasion literature with European politics, the suitability of contemporary military technology to deal with the armed forces of other nations, and international disputes, with its introduction of an alien adversary.

Although much of invasion literature may have been less sophisticated and visionary than Wells's novel, it was a useful, familiar genre to support the publication success of the piece, attracting readers used to such tales. It may also have proved an important foundation for Wells's ideas as he had never seen or fought in a war.

Scientific predictions and accuracy

Mars

Many novels focusing on life on other planets written close to 1900 echo scientific ideas of the time, including Pierre-Simon Laplace's nebular hypothesis, Charles Darwin's scientific theory of natural selection, and Gustav Kirchhoff's theory of spectroscopy. These scientific ideas combined to present the possibility that planets are alike in composition and conditions for the development of species, which would likely lead to the emergence of life at a suitable geological age in a planet's development.

By the time Wells wrote The War of the Worlds, there had been three centuries of observation of Mars through telescopes. Galileo observed the planet's phases in 1610 and in 1666 Giovanni Cassini identified the polar ice caps. In 1878 Italian astronomer Giovanni Schiaparelli observed geological features which he called canali (Italian for "channels"). This was mistranslated into English as "canals" which, being artificial watercourses, fuelled the belief in intelligent extraterrestrial life on the planet. This further influenced American astronomer Percival Lowell.

In 1895 Lowell published a book titled Mars, which speculated about an arid, dying landscape, whose inhabitants built canals to bring water from the polar caps to irrigate the remaining arable land. This formed the most advanced scientific ideas about the conditions on the red planet available to Wells at the time The War of the Worlds was written, but the concept was later proved erroneous by more accurate observation of the planet, and later landings by Russian and American probes such as the two Viking missions, that found a lifeless world too cold for water to exist in its liquid state.

Space travel
The Martians travel to the Earth in cylinders, apparently fired from a huge space gun on the surface of Mars. This was a common representation of space travel in the nineteenth century, and had also been used by Jules Verne in From the Earth to the Moon. Modern scientific understanding renders this idea impractical, as it would be difficult to control the trajectory of the gun precisely, and the force of the explosion necessary to propel the cylinder from the Martian surface to the Earth would likely kill the occupants.

However, the 16-year-old Robert H. Goddard was inspired by the story and spent much of his life building rockets. The work of the German rocket scientists Hermann Oberth and his student Wernher von Braun led to the V-2 rocket becoming the first artificial object to travel into space by crossing the Kármán line on 20 June 1944, and rocket developments culminated in the Apollo program's human landing on the Moon, and the landing of robotic probes on Mars.

Total war
The Martian invasion's principal weapons are the Heat-Ray and the poisonous Black Smoke. Their strategy includes the destruction of infrastructure such as armament stores, railways, and telegraph lines; it appears to be intended to cause maximum casualties, leaving humans without any will to resist. These tactics became more common as the twentieth century progressed, particularly during the 1930s with the development of mobile weapons and technology capable of surgical strikes on key military and civilian targets.

Wells's vision of a war bringing total destruction without moral limitations in The War of the Worlds was not taken seriously by readers at the time of publication. He later expanded these ideas in the novels When the Sleeper Wakes (1899), The War in the Air (1908), and The World Set Free (1914). This kind of total war did not become fully realised until the Second World War.

Critic Howard Black wrote that "In concrete details the Martian Fighting Machines as depicted by Wells have nothing in common with tanks or dive bombers, but the tactical and strategic use made of them is strikingly reminiscent of Blitzkrieg as it would be developed by the German armed forces four decades later. The description of the Martians advancing inexorably, at lightning speed, towards London; the British Army completely unable to put up an effective resistance; the British government disintegrating and evacuating the capital; the mass of terrified refugees clogging the roads, all were to be precisely enacted in real life at 1940 France." Black regarded this 1898 depiction as far closer to the actual land fighting of World War II than Wells's much later work The Shape of Things to Come (1933).

Weapons and armour
Wells's description of chemical weapons – the Black Smoke used by the Martian fighting machines to kill human beings in great numbers – became a reality in World War I. The comparison between lasers and the Heat-Ray was made as early as the later half of the 1950s when lasers were still in development. Prototypes of mobile laser weapons have been developed and are being researched and tested as a possible future weapon in space.

Military theorists of the era, including those of the Royal Navy prior to the First World War, had speculated about building a "fighting-machine" or a "land dreadnought". Wells later further explored the ideas of an armoured fighting vehicle in his short story "The Land Ironclads". There is a high level of science fiction abstraction in Wells's description of Martian automotive technology; he stresses how Martian machinery is devoid of wheels. They use "a complicated system of sliding parts" to produce movement, possess multiple whip-like tentacles for grasping, and paralleling animal motion, "quasi-muscles abounded in the crablike handling machine".

Interpretations

Natural selection

H. G. Wells was a student of Thomas Henry Huxley, a proponent of the theory of natural selection. In the novel, the conflict between mankind and the Martians is portrayed as a survival of the fittest, with the Martians whose longer period of successful evolution on the older Mars has led to them developing a superior intelligence, able to create weapons far in advance of humans on the younger planet Earth, who have not had the opportunity to develop sufficient intelligence to construct similar weapons.

Human evolution

The novel also suggests a potential future for human evolution and perhaps a warning against overvaluing intelligence against more human qualities. The Narrator describes the Martians as having evolved an overdeveloped brain, which has left them with cumbersome bodies, with increased intelligence, but a diminished ability to use their emotions, something Wells attributes to bodily function.

The Narrator refers to an 1893 publication suggesting that the evolution of the human brain might outstrip the development of the body, and organs such as the stomach, nose, teeth, and hair would wither, leaving humans as thinking machines, needing mechanical devices much like the Tripod fighting machines, to be able to interact with their environment. This publication is probably Wells's own "The Man of the Year Million", first published in The Pall Mall Gazette on 6 November 1893, which suggests similar ideas.

Colonialism and imperialism

At the time of the novel's publication the British Empire had conquered and colonised dozens of territories in Africa, Oceania, North and South America, the Middle East, South and Southeast Asia, and the Atlantic and Pacific islands.

While invasion literature had provided an imaginative foundation for the idea of the heart of the British Empire being conquered by foreign forces, it was not until The War of the Worlds that the reading public was presented with an adversary completely superior to themselves. A significant motivating force behind the success of the British Empire was its use of sophisticated technology; the Martians, also attempting to establish an empire on Earth, have technology superior to their British adversaries. In The War of the Worlds, Wells depicted an imperial power as the victim of imperial aggression, and thus perhaps encouraging the reader to consider imperialism itself.

Wells suggests this idea in the following passage:

Social Darwinism
The novel also dramatises the ideas of race presented in Social Darwinism, in that the Martians exercise over humans their 'rights' as a superior race, more advanced in evolution.

Social Darwinism suggested that the success of these different ethnic groups in world affairs, and social classes in a society, were the result of evolutionary struggle in which the group or class more fit to succeed did so; i.e., the ability of an ethnic group to dominate other ethnic groups or the chance to succeed or rise to the top of society was determined by genetic superiority. In more modern times it is typically seen as dubious and unscientific for its apparent use of Darwin's ideas to justify the position of the rich and powerful, or dominant ethnic groups.

Wells himself matured in a society wherein the merit of an individual was not considered as important as their social class of origin. His father was a professional sportsman, which was seen as inferior to 'gentle' status; whereas his mother had been a domestic servant, and Wells himself was, prior to his writing career, apprenticed to a draper. Trained as a scientist, he was able to relate his experiences of struggle to Darwin's idea of a world of struggle; but perceived science as a rational system, which extended beyond traditional ideas of race, class and religious notions, and in fiction challenged the use of science to explain political and social norms of the day.

Religion and science
Good and evil appear relative in The War of the Worlds, and the defeat of the Martians has an entirely material cause: the action of microscopic bacteria. An insane clergyman is important in the novel, but his attempts to relate the invasion to Armageddon seem examples of his mental derangement. His death, as a result of his evangelical outbursts and ravings attracting the attention of the Martians, appears an indictment of his obsolete religious attitudes; but the Narrator twice prays to God, and suggests that bacteria may have been divinely allowed to exist on Earth for a reason such as this, suggesting a more nuanced critique.

Influences

Mars and Martians

The novel originated several enduring Martian tropes in science fiction writing. These include Mars being an ancient world, nearing the end of its life, being the home of a superior civilisation capable of advanced feats of science and engineering, and also being a source of invasion forces, keen to conquer the Earth. The first two tropes were prominent in Edgar Rice Burroughs's "Barsoom" series beginning with A Princess of Mars in 1912.

Influential scientist Freeman Dyson, a key figure in the search for extraterrestrial life, also acknowledged his debt to reading H. G. Wells's fictions as a child.

The publication and reception of The War of the Worlds also established the vernacular term of 'martian' as a description for something offworldly or unknown.

Aliens and alien invasion

Antecedents
Wells is credited with establishing several extraterrestrial themes which were later greatly expanded by science fiction writers in the 20th century, including first contact and war between planets and their differing species. There were, however, stories of aliens and alien invasion prior to publication of The War of the Worlds.

In 1727 Jonathan Swift published Gulliver's Travels. The tale included a people who are obsessed with mathematics and more advanced than Europeans scientifically.  They populate a floating island fortress called Laputa, 4½ miles in diameter, which uses its shadow to prevent sun and rain from reaching earthly nations over which it travels, ensuring they will pay tribute to the Laputians.

Voltaire's Micromégas (1752) includes two beings from Saturn and Sirius who, though human in appearance, are of immense size and visit the Earth out of curiosity. At first the difference in scale between them and the peoples of Earth makes them think the planet is uninhabited. When they discover the haughty Earth-centric views of Earth philosophers, they are greatly amused by how important Earth beings think they are compared to greater beings in the universe such as themselves.

In 1892 Robert Potter, an Australian clergyman, published The Germ Growers in London. It describes a covert invasion by aliens who take on the appearance of human beings and attempt to develop a virulent disease to assist in their plans for global conquest. It was not widely read, and consequently Wells's vastly more successful novel is generally credited as the seminal alien invasion story.

The first science fiction to be set on Mars may be Across the Zodiac: The Story of a Wrecked Record (1880) by Percy Greg. It was a long-winded book concerned with a civil war on Mars. Another Mars novel, this time dealing with benevolent Martians coming to Earth to give humankind the benefit of their advanced knowledge, was published in 1897 by Kurd Lasswitz – Two Planets (Auf Zwei Planeten). It was not translated until 1971, and thus may not have influenced Wells, although it did depict a Mars influenced by the ideas of Percival Lowell.

Other examples are Mr. Stranger's Sealed Packet (1889), which took place on Mars, Gustavus W. Pope's Journey to Mars (1894), and Ellsworth Douglas's Pharaoh's Broker, in which the protagonist encounters an Egyptian civilisation on Mars which, while parallel to that of the Earth, has evolved somehow independently.

Early examples of influence on science fiction
Wells had already proposed another outcome for the alien invasion story in The War of the Worlds. When the Narrator meets the artilleryman the second time, the artilleryman imagines a future where humanity, hiding underground in sewers and tunnels, conducts a guerrilla war, fighting against the Martians for generations to come, and eventually, after learning how to duplicate Martian weapon technology, destroys the invaders and takes back the Earth.

Six weeks after publication of the novel, The Boston Post newspaper published another alien invasion story, an unauthorised sequel to The War of the Worlds, which turned the tables on the invaders. Edison's Conquest of Mars was written by Garrett P. Serviss, a now little remembered writer, who described the inventor Thomas Edison leading a counterattack against the invaders on their home soil. Though this is actually a sequel to Fighters from Mars, a revised and unauthorised reprint of The War of the Worlds, they both were first printed in the Boston Post in 1898. Lazar Lagin published Major Well Andyou in the USSR in 1962, an alternative view of events in The War of the Worlds from the viewpoint of a traitor.

The War of the Worlds was reprinted in the United States in 1927, before the Golden Age of science fiction, by Hugo Gernsback in Amazing Stories. John W. Campbell, another key science fiction editor of the era, and periodic short story writer, published several alien invasion stories in the 1930s. Many well known science fiction writers were to follow, including Isaac Asimov, Arthur C. Clarke, Clifford D. Simak and Robert A. Heinlein with The Puppet Masters and John Wyndham with The Kraken Wakes.

Later examples
The theme of alien invasion has remained popular to the present day and is frequently used in the plots of all forms of popular entertainment including movies, television, novels, comics and video games.

Alan Moore's graphic novel, The League of Extraordinary Gentlemen, Volume II, retells the events in The War of the Worlds.

Tripods

The Tripods trilogy of books features a central theme of invasion by alien-controlled tripods.

Adaptations

As of 2023, The War of the Worlds had inspired seven films, as well as various radio dramas, comics, video games, television series, and sequels or parallel stories by other authors.  Most are set in different locations or eras to the original novel. Among the adaptations is the 1938 radio broadcast narrated and directed by Orson Welles. The first two-thirds of the 60-minute broadcast were presented as a series of news bulletins, often described as having led to outrage and panic by listeners who believed the events described in the program to be real. However, later critics point out that the supposed panic was exaggerated by newspapers of the time, seeking to discredit radio as a source of news and information or exploit racial stereotypes. 

The first film adaptation was the The War of the Worlds, produced in 1953 by George Pal, directed by Byron Haskin, and starring Gene Barry. In 2005, Steven Spielberg directed another film version, starring Tom Cruise.

In 1978, Jeff Wayne produced a musical album of the story, with the voices of Richard Burton and David Essex. Wayne has also toured two live concert musical versions.

See also

 Deus ex machina
 Le Monde 100 Books of the Century
 The Space Machine
 The Second Invasion from Mars
 The Massacre of Mankind — an authorised sequel

References

Citations

Bibliography
 
 Coren, Michael (1993)  The Invisible Man : The Life and Liberties of H.G. Wells. Publisher: Random House of Canada. 
 Gosling, John. Waging the War of the Worlds. Jefferson, North Carolina, McFarland, 2009. Paperback, .
 
 
 
 
 Roth, Christopher F. (2005) "Ufology as Anthropology: Race, Extraterrestrials, and the Occult."  In E.T. Culture: Anthropology in Outerspaces, ed. by Debbora Battaglia. Durham, N.C.: Duke University Press.
 Yeffeth, Glenn (Editor) (2005) The War of the Worlds: Fresh Perspectives on the H. G. Wells Classic. Publisher: Benbella Books.

External links

 The War of the Worlds Invasion, large resource containing comment and review on the history of The War of the Worlds
 
 .
 
 Time Archives, a look at perceptions of The War of the Worlds over time
 Hundreds of cover images of the book's different editions, from 1898 to now

 
1898 British novels
1898 science fiction novels
Alien invasions in novels
War of the Worlds written fiction
Novels by H. G. Wells
Novels first published in serial form
Works originally published in Pearson's Magazine
Novels set in Surrey
Heinemann (publisher) books
Novels adapted into comics
British novels adapted into films
British novels adapted into plays
Novels about extraterrestrial life
Novels adapted into radio programs
British novels adapted into television shows
Novels adapted into video games
Science fiction novels adapted into films
Harper & Brothers books